Gillett's Crossing (also known as Gillett's Crossing St Annes and Gillett's Crossing Old Links) was a halt on the Fylde Coast railway line, in Lancashire, England. It opened on 1 October 1913 for the newly introduced railmotor service. It closed on 11 September 1939.

References

 , accessed 6 December 2010
 , accessed 6 December 2010
 Welch, M.S. (2004) Lancashire Steam Finale, Runpast Publishing, Cheltenham, p. 31

Disused railway stations in the Borough of Fylde
Former Preston and Wyre Joint Railway stations
Railway stations in Great Britain opened in 1913
Railway stations in Great Britain closed in 1915
Railway stations in Great Britain opened in 1919
Railway stations in Great Britain closed in 1939
Lytham St Annes
1913 establishments in England
1939 disestablishments in England